Sean Teepen (born May 2, 1991 in Cincinnati, Ohio) is an American retired soccer player who is currently an assistant coach for the University of Louisville men's soccer team.

Career

Youth and amateur
Teepen played college soccer at the University of Charleston between 2009 and 2012, where he also appeared for USL PDL club's West Virginia Chaos in 2011 and Michigan Bucks in 2012.

Professional
Teepen signed with USL Professional Division club Dayton Dutch Lions on July 3, 2013.

References

External links
 Charleston profile
 Bowling Green profile
 Louisville profile

1991 births
Living people
American soccer players
West Virginia Chaos players
Flint City Bucks players
Dayton Dutch Lions players
Association football goalkeepers
Soccer players from Cincinnati
USL League Two players
USL Championship players
Charleston Golden Eagles men's soccer players
Oakland Golden Grizzlies men's soccer coaches
High school soccer coaches in the United States
Charleston Golden Eagles women's soccer coaches
USL League Two coaches
Butler Bulldogs men's soccer coaches
Coastal Carolina Chanticleers men's soccer coaches
Oregon State Beavers men's soccer coaches
Bowling Green Falcons men's soccer coaches
Louisville Cardinals men's soccer coaches
Association football goalkeeping coaches
Player-coaches